Melanie Wilson may refer to:

 Melanie Wilson (actress), American actress
 Melanie Wilson (rower), British rower